Strung Up may refer to:

 Strung Up (Sweet album), 1975
 Strung Up (Nashville String Band album), 1971